Aunglan (formerly known as Allanmyo & Myede) is the biggest city in Thayet District of the Magway Region of Myanmar.  It is a port on the left (eastern) bank of the Irrawaddy, across and just north of Thayetmyo, between the cities of Pyay (Prome), Taungdwingyi (Prome) and Magway.  It is the administrative seat for Aunglan Township. According to the 2014 census, the population was estimated as over 235,000. The rural population is over 182,000 and urban population is 52,865.  47.5% of total population is male and 52.5% is female. Aunglan was a new city formed moving from Myede. After the second Anglo-Burmese war, the south of Myede Township was annexed by the British and the north was ruled by the Myanmar King.

Transport 
Since 1999, it has been served by a branch line of Myanmar Railways.

See also 
 Transport in Myanmar

Notes

Populated places in Thayet District
Township capitals of Myanmar